Simpkin may refer to:

 Simpkin (surname)
 Simpkin, a fictional cat in The Tailor of Gloucester (1903) by Beatrix Potter
 A. L. Simpkin & Co. Ltd, English confectionery makers
 Simpkin & Marshall, British bookseller, book wholesaler, and book publisher